Sancho Ramírez ( 1042 – 4 June 1094) was King of Aragon from 1063 until 1094 and King of Pamplona from 1076 under the name of Sancho V. He was the eldest son of Ramiro I and Ermesinda of Bigorre. His father was the first king of Aragon and an illegitimate son of Sancho III of Pamplona. He inherited the Aragonese crown from his father in 1063. Sancho Ramírez was chosen king of Pamplona by Navarrese noblemen after Sancho IV was murdered by his siblings.

Biography

Sancho Ramírez succeeded his father as second King of Aragon in 1063. Between 1067 and 1068, the War of the Three Sanchos involved him in a conflict with his first cousins, both also named Sancho: Sancho IV the king of Navarre and Sancho II the king of Castile, respectively.  The Castilian Sancho was trying to retake Bureba and Alta Rioja, which his father had given away to the king of Navarre and failed to retake.  The Navarrese Sancho begged the aid of the Aragonese Sancho to defend his kingdom.  Sancho of Castile defeated the two cousins and retook both Bureba and Alta Rioja, as well as Álava.

Sancho Ramírez followed his father's practice, not using the royal title early in his reign even though his state had become fully independent. This changed in 1076, when Sancho IV of Navarre was murdered by his own siblings, thus prompting a succession crisis in this neighboring kingdom that represented Aragon's nominal overlord. At first, the murdered king's young son, García, who had fled to Castile, was recognized as titular king by Alfonso VI, while Sancho Ramírez recruited to his side noblemen of Navarre who resented their kingdom falling under Alfonso's influence. The crisis was resolved by partition. Sancho Ramírez was elected King of Navarre, while he ceded previously contested western provinces of the kingdom to Alfonso. From this time, Sancho referred to himself as king not only of Navarre but also Aragon.

Sancho conquered Barbastro in 1064, Graus in 1083, and Monzón in 1089. He was defeated by El Cid, who was raiding his lands and those of his Muslim allies, at the Battle of Morella, probably in 1084. He perished in 1094 at the battle of Huesca.

They were divorced 1071. His second marriage, in 1076, was with Felicia (died 3 May 1123), daughter of Hilduin IV, Count of Montdidier. A third marriage—to Philippa of Toulouse—is sometimes given, but contemporary evidence records him as still married to Felicia at the time of his death. He was father of four sons: by Isabella, he had Peter, his successor; by Felicia he had Ferdinand, who was alive in 1086 but died within the next decade, Alfonso, who succeeded Peter, and Ramiro, who succeeded Alfonso.

Marriage and family

Sancho Ramírez married Isabella of Urgell, daughter of Ermengol III, Count of Urgell around the year 1062. They had one known child:

 Peter (c. 1068 – 1104), known as "the Catholic", who ruled as King of Aragon and Pamplona from 1094 until 1104. Peter married Agnes of Aquitaine.

Sancho Ramírez remarried around 1071 with Felicia of Roucy, daughter of Hilduin IV, Count of Montdidier. They had three children:

 Fernando Sánchez (1071 – 1094)
 Alfonso Sánchez ( 1073 – 1134), known as "the Battler", King of Aragon and Pamplona from 1104 until 1134. He married Urraca of León, Queen of León, Castile and Galicia. Their marriage was annulled in 1112.
 Ramiro Sánchez (1086 – 1157), known as "the Monk", King of Aragon between 1134 and 1157, and married to Agnes of Aquitaine in her second marriage after Viscount of Thouars, Aimery V.

Notes

Bibliography

External source
Medieval Lands Project on Infante don SANCHO Ramírez de Aragón

1040s births
1094 deaths
11th-century Aragonese monarchs
11th-century Navarrese monarchs
Place of birth missing
Burials at the Monastery of San Juan de la Peña
11th-century people from the Kingdom of Pamplona